is a prepaid rechargeable contactless smart card, electronic money used as a fare card on train lines in Japan, launched on November 18, 2001. The card can be used interchangeably with JR West's ICOCA in the Kansai region and San'yō region in Okayama, Hiroshima, and Yamaguchi prefectures, and also with JR Central's TOICA, JR Kyushu's SUGOCA, Nishitetsu's Nimoca, and Fukuoka City Subway's Hayakaken area in Fukuoka City and its suburb areas. The card is also increasingly being accepted as a form of electronic money for purchases at stores and kiosks, especially within train stations. As of 2018, JR East reports 69.4 million Suica UID's have been issued, usable at 476,300 point of sale locations, with 6.6 million daily transactions.

Since Suica is completely interchangeable with Pasmo (see Interoperation for the complete listing of companies and lines that accept Suica) in the greater Tokyo area, it is supported on virtually any train, tramway, and bus system (excluding various limited and shinkansen trains, as well as a few local buses as the system is still in the process of being extended to all routes).

Etymology
Suica stands for "Super Urban Intelligent CArd". In the logo, the "ic" is highlighted, standing for the initialism of integrated circuit in "IC card", which in turn is common Japanese vernacular for smart card. An additional meaning comes from the ideophone "sui sui" which means "to move smoothly", intended to highlight the smooth simplicity of using the card compared with traditional train tickets.  Since penguins can also swim smoothly through water, a penguin is used as a motif.

Uses
While Suica's primary usage is as a fare card for transportation services, it can also be used as electronic money for general purchases. With the exception of archaic models of the Suica, all Suica have the  logo, which indicates that the card can be used as an electronic money in addition to train fare usage. Older cards without the logo can be replaced at no cost. As of 2004, JR East employees use the card as an employee ID card.

Most vending machines, kiosks, and coin-operated lockers within JR stations can be paid with the card. In addition to payment, the card is also used as an electronic key to open the specific locker used. Outside of train stations, chain stores such as FamilyMart, 7-Eleven, Ministop, Yodobashi Camera and Bic Camera support transactions with Suica, however mostly restricted to the Kantō region only. A few shops at Narita International Airport, and taxis accept Suica. Stores that accept Suica are indicated by displaying either a Suica, Pasmo, Kitaca, Icoca, Toica, Sugoca, Nimoca, or Hayakaken logo. The card can also be used to make payments at supporting online shops, which requires the consumer to own a Sony FeliCa Reader hardware and a PC running the Windows operating system alongside the necessary drivers.

Functions and services

 
 
Usage of the card involves scanning it at a card reader. The technology allows for the card to be read at a short distance from the reader, so contact is not required. This functionality is in contrast to the instructions which frequently inform the user to  the card to the reader, a misnomer since it works with or without physical contact. In fact, it is possible to leave the card in most wallets and just pass the wallet over the reader as they enter the ticket gate.

The balance on the card is displayed when the user enters the ticket gate this way. The minimum fare is needed on the card when entering the train system, which is not deducted at that time. The balance is also displayed whenever the card is inserted into ticket or fare adjustment machines. A travel record is stored on the card, and can be displayed or printed out at the same places where cards can be purchased and reloaded. On exit, the card is again scanned at a card reader. At this time the fare is deducted from the remaining balance from the card and the new balance is displayed.

The card can also be used to store a commuter pass. This is available for purchase from regular ticket machines and allows a Monthly, 3-monthly or Annual pass for travel between two JR stations to be stored on the card.

On some occasions, when traveling to a station where Suica is not supported, the card must be handed over to the staff at the exiting station, so that they can calculate the remaining fare and return a slip of paper which must be given to the staff at the next station where Suica is used. Since the system keeps track of when a card enters and leaves a station, if the records show that the card had entered a station but not left (due to the situation such as described above, or technical malfunctions), the station staff can reset the card.

Points of purchase
These cards are available at card vending machines at the train stations that allows Suica. A new card costs 2,000 yen, which includes a 500 yen deposit that will be refunded if the card is returned. The remaining 1,500 yen is immediately available for train rides, and more money can be charged on to the card (in 500 yen, 1,000 yen, 2,000 yen, 3,000 yen, 4,000 yen, 5,000 yen, and 10,000 yen increments), up to a card maximum of 20,000 yen, at similar ticket vending machines or fare adjustment machines displaying the Suica logo inside each station.

Types of cards
Suica are sold by JR East and two of its subsidiaries:
Suica, MySuica, Welcome Suica and View Suica cards are sold directly by JR East
Rinkai Suica cards are sold by Tokyo Waterfront Area Rapid Transit (Rinkai Line)
Monorail Suica cards are sold by Tokyo Monorail

Credit card integrations
The View Suica cards pairs the prepaid Suica with a credit card. Various types exist, including at least one available through JR and View, and others such as the Bic Camera Suica. These function both as a prepaid Suica as well as a regular credit card, and provide an auto-charge feature to prevent exhausting the Suica balance unintentionally. The automatically recharged amount is added to the user's credit card bill. Thus, these cards have two balances: a prepaid Suica balance and a credit balance for which monthly bills are sent. Thus, store-related cards like the Bic Suica can include fully three separate functions: serving as a store point card, a general use Suica, and as a credit card. Any credit purchase (restricted, in the case of Bic, to JCB) adds a small amount to the available points on the store point card. Yet another type of Suica offered by Japan Airlines that is called JALCARD Suica. In addition to having Suica and credit card functionalities, a JALCARD Suica can also function as an electronic boarding pass for a JAL-operated domestic flight in Japan at an airport that offers the JAL IC service.

MySuica
MySuica allows users to input personal information at the time the card is created. If the card is later lost or stolen, the user can obtain a new card with the previous balance.

Welcome Suica

In August 2019, JR East unveiled Welcome Suica, a Suica variant designed for use by tourists to Japan. The card's design features white cherry blossoms on a red background.

Welcome Suica is also reloadable, but unlike regular Suica cards, Welcome Suica does not require the user to make a deposit. However, Welcome Suica can only be used for 28 days from the date of purchase after which it stops working. It is also nonrefundable, regardless of the balance or user's activity.

JR East request customers always carry with them a reference sheet, or receipt, to accompany the card.

Card stacking
Ticket gates return an error when the scan encounters more than one compatible card. Although it is intended that each person have only one Suica, many people have more than one. Further, since the introduction of Pasmo in March 2007, more people have at least one of each. Consequently, JR has begun, and intensified since March, an awareness campaign to discourage commuters from storing multiple cards together. Incompatible cards, such as Edy, seem to have an inconsistent effect on a machine's ability to read the card which may depend on the reading device. On the other hand, the Express-IC (EX-IC) card for Tokaido Shinkansen reservations is meant to be used in this manner (stacked on either a Suica or ICOCA to facilitate transfer between Shinkansen and regular lines).

Technology
The card incorporates a contactless  Near Field Communication (NFC) technology developed by Sony, called FeliCa. The same technology is also deployed in the Edy electronic cash cards used in Japan, the Octopus card in Hong Kong, and the EZ-Link Card in Singapore.

Interoperation

On 18 March 2007, the Tokyo-area private railways, bus companies, and subways implemented Pasmo, a smart card solution to replace the existing Passnet magnetic card system. Through collaboration with JR East, passengers can use Suica wherever Pasmo cards are accepted to ride any railway or bus in the Tokyo metropolitan area. Monthly passes for JR East lines can only be on Suica, while monthly passes for Tokyo Metro can only be on Pasmo cards but otherwise, the cards are functionally identical for commuters.

This agreement has since been implemented with other systems across Japan. On 23 March 2013, a nationwide inter-operation among 10 transportation smart cards started. As of 2014 Suica has interoperability with ICOCA, Kitaca, PASMO, TOICA, manaca, PiTaPa, SUGOCA, nimoca, hayakaken and several other local smart cards.

In 22 July 2014, Nintendo added support for Suica and Pasmo cards in the Nintendo eShop through the NFC function of the Wii U GamePad and the New Nintendo 3DS. The service was then discontinued on 18 January 2022.

Mobile devices

Mobile Suica

Since January 2006, a version called  was incorporated into mobile FeliCa wallet phones by Japan's mobile operators. This system includes Java applications to manage the Suica function in the mobile phone, to recharge the Suica stored in the mobile phone, review the stored value and perform other functions via the mobile phone. An enhancement for 2007 allowed for Suica charges to be added directly to the phone bill, eliminating the requirement to constantly add to and monitor the remaining balance. On 23 May 2011, JR announced debut of Mobile Suica app for Android Smartphones supporting Osaifu-Keitai.

Mobile Suica is a service for Osaifu Keitai mobile phones, first launched on 28 January 2006 by NTT DoCoMo and au in Japan, and now also offered by SoftBank Mobile and Willcom.

Just like traditional Suica cards, which are prepaid rechargeable contactless smart cards mainly used to pay for fares on the JR East railway network, Mobile Suica can also be charged when the remaining balance gets low. Other features supported by the mobile phone includes the ability to review past Suica transactions via the mobile's display. Suica uses Sony's FeliCa chip for its main functionalities. Mobile Suica interacts with the FeliCa chip using Java technology.

Since October 2006, it is possible to register for Mobile Suica using any major credit card, a Suica VIEW card is no longer required. A limited e-money only application called "Easy Mobile Suica" (which does not require a credit card) was also launched in late October 2006.

Apple Pay 
On September 7, 2016, Apple announced that Suica cards could be added to Apple Pay in the Wallet app and used in the same way as a physical card. This functionality was limited to devices purchased in Japan which included FeliCa support: iPhone 7 (model A1779 and A1785) and Apple Watch Series 2.

With the release of the iPhone 8, iPhone X and the Apple Watch Series 3, and later, devices purchased anywhere in the world could be used with Apple Pay Suica.

iOS 13 introduced support for creating a virtual Suica card from the Wallet app.

iOS 15 introduced new Wallet app improvements and a dedicated category for adding Suica and other transit cards regardless of the device region setting.

Google Pay 
On 24 May 2018, Google announced that Suica cards could be added to Google Pay. This functionality is limited to Android devices that are purchased in Japan that support Osaifu-Keitai and have their Google Account's region set to Japan.

See also
Mass transit system
Electronic money
List of smart cards

References

External links
  
  
 http://www.sony.net/Products/felica/
 JR-East: Mobile Suica (In Japanese)
 JR-East: Research and Development > R&D Story

2001 introductions
2001 establishments in Japan
Japanese inventions
Contactless smart cards
Fare collection systems in Japan
East Japan Railway Company